Hemiarcha tetrasticta is a moth in the family Gelechiidae. It was described by Turner in 1919. It is found in Australia, where it has been recorded from Queensland.

The wingspan is 10–12 mm. The forewings are whitish-brown more or less suffused with fuscous and with four conspicuous dark-fuscous spots, a median spot at one-sixth, the first discal at one-third, the plical before the first discal and the second discal before two-thirds. The hindwings are pale-grey.

References

Hemiarcha
Moths described in 1919